Events in the year 1958 in Mexico.

Incumbents

Federal government
 President: Adolfo Ruiz Cortines (until November 30), Adolfo López Mateos (starting December 1)
 Interior Secretary (SEGOB): Ángel Carvajal Bernal (until November 30), Gustavo Díaz Ordaz (starting December 1) 
 Secretary of Foreign Affairs (SRE): Luis Padilla Nervo/Manuel Tello Baurraud
 Communications Secretary (SCT): Walter Cross Buchanan
 Education Secretary (SEP): José Ángel Ceniceros
 Secretary of Defense (SEDENA): Matias Ramos
 Secretary of Navy: Roberto Gómez Maqueo/Héctor Meixueiro/Manuel Zermeño Araico
 Secretary of Labor and Social Welfare: Salomón González Blanco

Supreme Court

 President of the Supreme Court: Agapito Pozo Balbás

Governors

 Aguascalientes: Luis Ortega Douglas
 Baja California: Braulio Maldonado Sández 
 Campeche: Alberto Trueba Urbina
 Chiapas: Efraín Aranda Osorio/Samuel León Brindis
 Chihuahua: Teófilo Borunda
 Coahuila: Raúl Madero González
 Colima: Rodolfo Chávez Carrillo
 Durango: Francisco González de la Vega
 Guanajuato: J. Jesús Rodríguez Gaona
 Guerrero: Raúl Caballero Aburto
 Hidalgo: Alfonso Corona del Rosal
 Jalisco: Agustín Yáñez 
 State of Mexico: Gustavo Baz Prada
 Michoacán: David Franco Rodríguez 
 Morelos: Norberto López Avelar
 Nayarit: Francisco García Montero
 Nuevo León: Raúl Rangel Frías
 Oaxaca: Alfonso Pérez Gasca
 Puebla: Fausto M. Ortega
 Querétaro: Juan C. Gorraéz
 San Luis Potosí: Manuel Álvarez 
 Sinaloa: Gabriel Leyva Velásquez
 Sonora: Álvaro Obregón Tapia
 Tabasco: Miguel Orrico de los Llanos
 Tamaulipas: Norberto Treviño Zapata
 Tlaxcala: Joaquín Cisneros Molina
 Veracruz: Antonio María Quirasco
 Yucatán: Víctor Mena Palomo/Agustín Franco Aguilar
 Zacatecas: Francisco E. García
Regent of the Federal District: Ernesto P. Uruchurtu

Events

 Diego Rivera donates Frida Kahlo's childhood home and its contents in order to turn it into the Frida Kahlo Museum. 
 The Aurrerá grocery chain starts operating.
 Hotel chain Camino Real Hotels is founded.
 July 6: 1958 Mexican general election.
 Conflicto_entre_Guatemala_y_M%C3%A9xico_(1958-1959)

Awards
Belisario Domínguez Medal of Honor – Heriberto Jara Corona

Births
February 16 — Fernando Ortega Bernés, 16th Governor of Campeche 2009-2015
April 30 — Guillermo Capetillo, bullfighter and voice actor
May 3 — Rutilio Escandón, lawyer and Governor of Chiapas 2018-2024
May 17 – Gus Rodríguez, Mexican writer, director and video game journalist (d. April 11, 2020)
June 10 — Alfredo Adame, actor and producer
June 22 — Rocío Banquells, Mexican pop singer and actress
July 3 — Héctor Astudillo Flores, lawyer and politician (PRI), Governor of Guerrero starting 2015
July 26 – Jesús Barrero, actor and voice actor (Saint Seiya) (d. 2016).
September 27 – Faustino López Vargas, politician (d. 2022)
October 3 — Francisco Rojas San Román, politician (Deputy from the State of Mexico, 2009-2012) (d. 2018).
October 5 — Manuel Landeta, singer and soap opera actor
October 24 —  José Manuel Mireles Valverde, doctor and paramilitary leader (d. 2020)
November 14 — Sergio Goyri, actor
Date unknown
Abril Campillo, actress; breast cancer (d. 2017).

Deaths

Film

 List of Mexican films of 1958

Sport

 1957–58 Mexican Primera División season. 
 Leones de Yucatán win the Mexican League.
 Salamanca F.C. and Alacranes de Durango are founded.

References

 
Mexico